The University of Sydney's Brain and Mind Centre was established for the research and treatment of disorders of the brain and mind.

Child development and behaviour, mental health, and ageing and neurodegeneration are among the greatest health challenges of the 21st century. The Brain and Mind Centre strives to see a world where people affected can reach their full potential and play an active role in society.

History 
The Brain and Mind Centre was formally launched in 2015 when it was recognised as a multidisciplinary strategic priority for the University of Sydney. Prior to this, the research facility was known as the Brain and Mind Research Institute, which was founded in 2003 by Ian Hickie and Max Bennett.

The research centre is affiliated with the University of Sydney, the Sydney Area Health Service and Royal Prince Alfred Hospital.

See also

Health in Australia

References

External links

2003 establishments in Australia
Cerebral palsy organizations
Medical research institutes in Sydney
Mental health organisations in Australia
Research institutes established in 2003
Sydney Medical School
Buildings and structures awarded the Sir John Sulman Medal